Lee County is located in southwestern Florida on the Gulf Coast. As of the 2020 census, the population was 760,822. The county seat is Fort Myers (with a population of 86,395 as of the 2020 census), and the largest city is Cape Coral with an estimated 2020 population of 194,016. The county comprises the Cape Coral–Fort Myers, FL Metropolitan Statistical Area.

Lee County was established in 1887 from Monroe County. Fort Myers is the county seat and a center of tourism in Southwest Florida. Lee County is the home for spring training of the Boston Red Sox and Minnesota Twins Major League Baseball teams.

History

Protohistory and European contact (500-1799)
The area that is now Lee County has several archaeological sites that show evidence of habitation by peoples belonging to the Caloosahatchee culture (500 AD to 1750 AD). By the time of European contact, the area was more specifically occupied by the Calusa. After European contact, fishermen from Cuba and other Spanish colonies set up fishing camps, known as "ranchos", on the southern portion of the Gulf Coast of Florida. These ranchos extended from Charlotte Harbor (estuary) down to San Carlos Bay and the mouth of the Caloosahatchee. These ranchos, likely established in the latter parts of the 1600's, were precursors to the larger European settlements that would be established in the following centuries. As the 18th century came to an end, the Calusa who had once inhabited the area were replaced with the Seminole. In particular, in 1799, an Indian agent noted the existence of a Seminole town on the "Cull-oo-saw-hat-che" or Caloosahatchee River.

Fort established (1850s–1860s)
After Florida became a U.S. territory in 1821, a number of settlers moved into Florida, causing conflict with the local Seminole Indians. Fort Myers was built in 1850 as a military fort to fend off Seminole Indians during the Seminole Wars. The fort was named after Col. Abraham C. Myers, who was stationed in Florida for seven years and was the son-in-law of the fort's establisher and commander. In 1858, after years of elusive battle, Chief Billy Bowlegs and his warriors were persuaded to surrender and move west, and the fort was abandoned. Billy's Creek, which flows into the Caloosahatchee River, was named after a temporary camp where Billy Bowlegs and his men awaited ships to take them west. In 1863, the fort was reoccupied by federal troops during the Civil War. In 1865, in the Battle of Fort Myers, the fort was attacked by a small group of Confederates. The Union's garrison, led by Captain James Doyle, successfully held the fort and the Confederate forces retreated. After the war, the fort was again deserted. The fort was later disassembled and some of its wood was used to build parts of downtown Fort Myers.

Settlement and early growth (1860s–1920s)
During the Civil War, Fort Myers was occupied by federal troops with the intention of disrupting the Confederate cattle supply from Florida. In February 1865, it was the site of the Battle of Fort Myers. The first settlers in Fort Myers arrived in 1866. In the 1870s, Tervio Padilla, a wealthy merchant from the Canary Islands, came by way of Key West to Cayo Costa and established trade with natives and "ranchos" that extended northward to Charlotte Harbor. His ships often made port at Cayo Costa at the entrance to the harbor. Enchanted by the tropical island, he eventually decided to settle there. Padilla prospered until the outbreak of the Spanish–American War, when his fleet was burned and scuttled. He then turned to another means of livelihood – fishing. When the government claimed his land, he was disinclined to set up another ranch, so moved with his wife further down the island and as before, simply homesteaded. The Padilla family is one of the first pioneer families of Lee County and many still reside within the county mainly around the Pine Island area.

In 1882, the city experienced a significant influx of settlers. In 1885, when Fort Myers was incorporated, its population of 349 residents made it the second-largest city only to Tampa on Florida's west coast south of Cedar Key, even larger than Clearwater and Sarasota, also growing cities at the time. Lee County was formed in 1887 from Monroe County, with Fort Myers serving as the county seat. It was named for Robert E. Lee, Confederate general in the American Civil War. Fort Myers first became a nationally known winter resort with the opening of the Royal Palm Hotel in 1898, built by New York City department store magnate Hugh O'Neill. Fort Myers was the frequent winter home of Thomas Edison, as well as Henry Ford. In 1911, Fort Myers was incorporated as a city. In 1923, Collier and Hendry Counties were created by splitting these areas from Lee County. Construction of the Tamiami Trail Bridge, built across the Caloosahatchee River in 1924, sparked the city's growth. After the bridge's construction, the city experienced its first real estate boom and many subdivisions sprouted around the city. In 1927, a property purchased by the City of Fort Myers was turned into an airport eventually called Page Field.

Modern growth (1940s–present)

During World War II, Page Field served as an advanced fighter training base and home to the several bomber groups. Following the war, a small terminal was built in the mid-1950s as the airport transitioned to commercial use. Another airfield was constructed in 1942 called Buckingham Army Airfield. The base was closed down in 1945, after which the barracks served as classrooms for Edison College until 1948. Following the end of World War II, the Royal Palm Hotel was closed permanently, and in 1947, the hotel on the corner of First and Fowler was torn down.

Lee County has been the host to several Major League Baseball teams for spring training over the past several decades.

The county received a boost in 1983 when Southwest Florida Regional Airport (now known as Southwest Florida International Airport) opened.

Hurricanes
On August 13, 2004, the county was struck by Hurricane Charley, a category 4 storm, particularly on the northwestern islands of Captiva, Gasparilla, and North Captiva. On September 10, 2017, Lee County was struck by Hurricane Irma as a Category 2 storm. On September 28, 2022, Hurricane Ian made landfall on Lee County as a Category 4 storm, causing major damage to Sanibel, Pine Island, and surrounding areas. Sanibel Causeway partially collapsed in the aftermath of Hurricane Ian. 55 deaths occurred in Lee County as of October 4.

Geography
Rivers and streams include the Caloosahatchee River, the Imperial River, the Estero River, Hendry Creek, and Orange River. Lee County is on the southwest coast of Florida.

Adjacent counties
 Charlotte County (north)
 Glades County (northeast)
 Collier County (southeast)
 Hendry County (east)

National protected areas
 Caloosahatchee National Wildlife Refuge
 J.N. "Ding" Darling National Wildlife Refuge
 Matlacha Pass National Wildlife Refuge
 Pine Island National Wildlife Refuge

Islands

 Big Hickory Island
 Captiva Island
 Cayo Costa (Cayo Costa State Park)
 Cabbage Key
 Estero Island (Town of Fort Myers Beach)
 Gasparilla Island (community of Boca Grande)
 Little Hickory Island (Beaches of Bonita Springs)
 Lovers Key / Carl E. Johnson State Park
 Matlacha Island Matlacha, Florida
 Mound Key Archaeological State Park
 North Captiva Island
 Pine Island
 San Carlos Island (Town of Fort Myers Beach)
 Sanibel Island (Town of Sanibel)
 Useppa Island

Climate
Lee County has a year-round warm, monsoon-influenced climate that is close to the boundary between tropical and subtropical climates ( in the coldest month), thus is either classified as a humid subtropical climate (Köppen Cfa), which is the classification used by NOAA, or a tropical savanna climate (Köppen Aw). Lee County has short, warm winters, and long, hot, humid summers, with most of the year's rainfall occurring from June to September. At 89, Lee County leads the nation in the number of days annually in which a thunderstorm is close enough for thunder to be heard.

Demographics

2020 Census

As of the 2020 United States census, there were 760,822 people, 288,916 households, and 187,877 families residing in the county. 4.6% of that population was under the age of 5 years old, 17.3% was under 18 years old, and 29.2% was 65 years or older. 51.0% was female.

The median household income was $59,608 with a per capita income of $34,818. 10.5% of population below the poverty threshold. The median value of owner-occupied housing-units between 2016-2020 was $235,300 and the median gross rent was $1,225. 94.2% of the households had a computer and 87.2% of households had a broadband internet subscription.

89.3% of the population that was 25 years or older were High school graduates and 28.5% of those 25 years or older had a Bachelor's degree or higher.

Languages
As of 2010, 78.99% of residents spoke English as their first language, and 15.19% spoke Spanish, 1.28% French Creole (mostly Haitian Creole,) 0.88% German, 0.59% Portuguese, and 0.55% of the population spoke French as their main language. In total, 21.01% of the population spoke languages other than English as their primary language.

Economy
Lee County's stronger economic sectors include construction, retail, leisure, and hospitality. Hertz moved its headquarters from New Jersey to Estero in 2016, the first major corporation to relocate to Lee County.
The largest employers in Lee County as of 2019 are:

Law enforcement and crime

The Lee County Sheriff's Office is the primary law enforcement agency for Lee County.

 

The Lee County Sheriff’s Office employs civilian dispatchers who provide dispatch for LCSO Deputies, and Florida Southwestern State College Police. The Cape Coral Police Department, Fort Myers Police Department, the Sanibel Police Department, and the Lee County Port Authority Police maintain their own police dispatch centers.

Education

The several colleges in Lee County include: Florida Gulf Coast University (FGCU), Barry University, Nova Southeastern University, Florida SouthWestern State College, Cape Coral Technical College, Fort Myers Technical College, Hodges University, Keiser University, Southern Technical College, and Rasmussen College.

FGCU is a public university located just south of the Southwest Florida International Airport in South Fort Myers. The university belongs to the 12-campus State University System of Florida. FGCU competes in the ASUN Conference in NCAA Division I sports. The school is accredited by the Commission on Colleges of the Southern Association of Colleges and Schools to award associate's, 51 different types of bachelor's, 29 different master's, and six types of doctoral degrees.

Parks and recreation 
The parks are maintained by the county's Parks & Recreation department. The department also maintains spring training facilities for the Boston Red Sox and Minnesota Twins.

Beaches 
Some of the main tourist attractions in Southwest Florida are its beaches. Lee County is home to ten beach parks and an additional seven beach accesses, maintained by Lee County Parks & Recreation.

Libraries

The Lee County Library System has 13 branches. The towns of Fort Myers Beach and Sanibel Island, though located in Lee County, maintain their own independent public library entities.

The Lee County Library System currently provides more than 294,000 Lee County residents with over 1.5 million items and materials available for use or patron circulation, as well as an online library materials catalog, free wi-fi, public computer access, scan and print capabilities, and many more patron amenities.

Politics
Unlike most urban counties, Lee County is a Republican stronghold in presidential elections. It was one of the first areas of Florida to break away from a Solid South voting pattern. The last Democratic presidential candidate to win the county was Franklin D. Roosevelt in 1944. Since then, Adlai Stevenson II, Lyndon Johnson, Jimmy Carter and Barack Obama have been the only Democrats to manage 40 percent of the vote.

Lee County is represented in the United States House of Representatives by Byron Donalds of the 19th district and by Greg Steube of the 17th district. Most of the county is in the 19th, while the far eastern portion is in the 17th.

Voter demographics 
As of March 31, 2022.

Transportation

Airports
Southwest Florida International Airport (IATA airport code - RSW), in South Fort Myers, serves over 8.37 million passengers annually. Currently, the airport offers international non-stop flights to Cancun, Mexico; Düsseldorf, Germany; Nassau, Bahamas; and Montreal, Ottawa and Toronto in Canada. In addition, nine airlines operate flights to 29 domestic nonstop destinations.  On September 9, 2005, the airport opened a new terminal.

Page Field (IATA airport code - FMY), also in South Fort Myers, just south of the incorporated limits of the City of Fort Myers, is the county's general aviation airport.  Prior to the opening of Southwest Florida Regional Airport in 1983 (now Southwest Florida International Airport), Page Field was the county's commercial airport.

Seaports and marine transport
A small port operation continues in Boca Grande, being used as a way-point for oil distribution.  However, Port Boca Grande has been in decline for many years as the shipping industry has moved north, especially to the Port of Tampa.

In addition, a private enterprise operates a high-speed, passenger-only ferry service between Fort Myers Beach from San Carlos Island and Key West. Another ferry service is offered from Fort Myers to Key West

Major highways

Major road bridges
Caloosahatchee Bridge (U.S. Highway 41): 4-travel-lane single-span bridge connects North Fort Myers with Fort Myers, over the Caloosahatchee River.

Cape Coral Bridge (College Parkway/Cape Coral Parkway): 4-travel-lane single-span bridge (two eastbound, two westbound) connect Cape Coral with Cypress Lake, over the Caloosahatchee River.

Edison Bridge (State Road 739): Two 3-travel-lane spans (one northbound, one southbound) connect North Fort Myers with Fort Myers, over the Caloosahatchee River.

Interstate 75: Two 4-travel-lane spans (one northbound, one southbound) between the State Road 78 ("Bayshore Road") and State Road 80 ("Palm Beach Boulevard") interchanges, over the Caloosahatchee River.

Matanzas Pass Bridge (State Road 865): 3-travel-lane single-span bridge crosses Hurricane Bay and Matanzas Pass within the incorporated limits of the Town of Fort Myers Beach, connecting the mainland to the barrier islands.

Matlacha Bridge (State Road 78): a small single-leaf drawbridge connecting Cape Coral to Matlacha and Pine Island

Midpoint Memorial Bridge (State Road 884): 4-lane single-span bridge that connects Cape Coral with Fort Myers, over the Caloosahatchee River.

Sanibel Causeway (State Road 867): series of three 2-travel-lane single-span bridges and two 3-travel-lane island causeways crossing the mouth of the Caloosahatchee River at the Gulf of Mexico. The causeway connects Punta Rassa with Sanibel.

Wilson Pigott Bridge (State Road 31): 2-travel-lane single-span drawbridge between State Road 78 ("Bayshore Road") and State Road 80, over the Caloosahatchee River.

Mass transportation
Fixed-route bus service is provided by the Lee County Transit Department, operated as "LeeTran".  Several routes extend outward from the Downtown Intermodal Transfer Center; in addition, suburb-to-suburb routes are operated, as well as park-and-ride service to and from both Fort Myers Beach and Southwest Florida International Airport.

The Downtown Intermodal Transfer Center in Fort Myers also serves as an intermediate stop on Greyhound Lines bus service.

Media

Newspapers
Newspapers include The News-Press and Florida Weekly.

Radio
Arbitron standard radio market: Ft Myers-Naples-Marco Island With an Arbitron-assigned 783,100 listening area population, the metropolitan area ranks 62/299 for the fall of 2006. The metropolitan area is home to 32 radio stations.

Television
Nielsen Media Research designated market area: Ft. Myers-Naples

Number of TV homes: 479,130

2006–2007 U.S. rank: 64/210
 WBBH – NBC affiliate
 WFTX – Fox affiliate
 WGCU – PBS member station
 WINK – CBS affiliate
 WINK-DT2 – MyNetworkTV/Antenna TV affiliate
 WRXY - Christian Television Network affiliate
 WTPH – Azteca America affiliate
 WUVF - Univision affiliate
 WWDT - Telemundo affiliate
 WXCW – CW television network affiliate
 WZVN – ABC affiliate

Sports

Fort Myers is home to Florida Gulf Coast University. Its teams, the Florida Gulf Coast Eagles, play in NCAA Division I in the ASUN Conference. The Eagles' men's basketball team had an average attendance of 2,291 in 2013.

MLB spring training

The Boston Red Sox hold their annual spring training at JetBlue Park at Fenway South in the Fort Myers area. A cross-town rivalry has developed with the Minnesota Twins, which conduct their spring training at Hammond Stadium in south Lee County, which has a capacity of 7,500 and opened in 1991.

The Red Sox' lease with Fort Myers ran through 2019, but the Red Sox were considering exercising the early out in their contract that would have allowed them to leave following the 2009 spring season. On October 28, 2008, the Lee County commission voted 3–1 to approve an agreement with the Boston Red Sox to build a new spring-training facility for the team in south Lee County. That stadium, named JetBlue Park at Fenway South, is located off Daniels Parkway near Southwest Florida International Airport. The stadium opened in time for the 2012 season.

City of Palms Park had been built in 1992 for the Red Sox' spring training. Former Red Sox left fielder Mike Greenwell is from Fort Myers, and was instrumental in bringing his team to the city for spring training. The deal for JetBlue Park left City of Palms Park without a tenant. County officials have discussed the possibility of securing another team for City of Palms. Terry Park Ballfield (also known as the Park T. Pigott Memorial Stadium) in East Fort Myers is also not currently in use by a Major League Baseball team, though it is the former home of the Philadelphia Athletics, Cleveland Indians, Pittsburgh Pirates, and Kansas City Royals.

Communities

Cities
 Bonita Springs
 Cape Coral
 Fort Myers
 Sanibel

Town
 Fort Myers Beach

Village
 Estero

Municipality 
 Lehigh Acres

Census-designated places

 Alva
 Bokeelia
 Buckingham
 Burnt Store Marina
 Captiva
 Charleston Park
 Cypress Lake
 East Dunbar (former CDP; since annexed by city of Fort Myers)
 Florida Gulf Coast University
 Fort Myers Shores
 Gateway
 Harlem Heights
 Iona
 Lochmoor Waterway Estates
 Matlacha (on Matlacha Island)
 Matlacha Isles-Matlacha Shores
 McGregor
 North Fort Myers
 Olga
 Page Park
 Palmona Park
 Pine Island Center
 Pine Manor
 Pineland (on Pine Island)
 Punta Rassa
 San Carlos Park
 St. James City
 Suncoast Estates
 Tanglewood (former CDP)
 Three Oaks
 Tice
 Verandah
 Villas
 Whiskey Creek

Other unincorporated communities
 Babcock Ranch
 Boca Grande

See also

 List of memorials to Robert E. Lee
 National Register of Historic Places listings in Lee County, Florida
 Southwest Florida

Notes

References

External links 
 
 Lee County government website

 
1887 establishments in Florida
Charter counties in Florida
Populated places established in 1887